WEZN-FM (99.9 MHz, "Star 99.9") is a commercial radio station, licensed to Bridgeport, Connecticut, and serving Southern Connecticut. The station is owned by Connoisseur Media and it airs a hot adult contemporary radio format. The WEZN studios are located on Wheelers Farms Road in Milford; the station's transmitter is on Green Haven Road in Trumbull.

WEZN has a strong signal which reaches north of Hartford, Connecticut, and into southern Hampden County, Massachusetts. The signal is heard in Suffolk and Nassau counties on Long Island to the south and into Westchester County, New York, to the west. It can be heard in Monmouth County, New Jersey.

History
On October 24, 1960, the station first signed on the air as WJZZ, the FM sister station of WICC.  As the call letters imply, the station started out as a jazz outlet.  It was the first station to be assigned the WJZZ call sign followed by 105.9 FM in Detroit, Michigan (now WDMK), and 107.5 FM in Atlanta, Georgia (now WAMJ).  There were few FM radios in the 1960s and the all-jazz format was not financially viable.  For a time, WICC simulcast the programming from AM 600 on FM 99.9. WICC sold the station after several years.

The station was later bought by Williams Broadcasting, carrying a beautiful music format and changing its call letters to WEZN to reflect its easy listening sound.  While WEZN was a popular and profitable station, the audience wanting to hear mostly orchestras and instrumental music was aging.  So in the 1990s, WEZN gradually added more soft adult contemporary vocals until it made the switch to full-time adult contemporary.  At the same time, 107.9 WDJF in nearby Westport, Connecticut, also moved to an adult contemporary format, so WEZN went a step further, implementing a hot adult contemporary format.

Despite the format changes, the station has kept its WEZN call sign; however, outside of hourly station identifications, it rarely says those call letters on the air, preferring the handle "Star 99.9."

The station was purchased from Cox Radio by Connoisseur Media along with sister stations WFOX and WPLR, at a purchase price of $40 million.  Connoisseur Media took ownership on May 10, 2013.

References

External links 
  

Mass media in Bridgeport, Connecticut
Mass media in Fairfield County, Connecticut
EZN-FM
Connoisseur Media radio stations
Radio stations established in 1960
1960 establishments in Connecticut
Hot adult contemporary radio stations in the United States